Konstantin Anatolyevich Babkin (born 13 February 1971) is a Russian businessman and politician. He is the chairman of the Federal Council of the political party Party of Action, which supports the Vladimir Putin regime in Russia.

He supported Russia's 2022 invasion of Ukraine. After Russia's annexation of Crimea, Babkin said to a crowd at a rally, "We should not stop at Crimea!"

He is the president of CJSC Novoe Sodruzhestvo and the president Rosspetsmash association. Member of the board of directors of Rostselmash, Empils and formerly Buhler Industries. chairman of the board of the Chamber of Commerce and Industry of the Russian Federation on Industrial Development and Competitiveness of the Russian Economy.

Early life and education
Babkin was born in 1971 in Miass (Chelyabinsk region; USSR) in the family of engineers of the State Rocket Center. In 1994, graduated from the department of molecular and chemical physics of Moscow Institute of Physics and Technology.

Career
In 1992, Babkin became the co-founder of the Joint-Stock Company Industrial Association Commonwealth. Since 2005 he has been the president of the CJSC Production Association Novoe Sodruzhestvo. The company includes 20 enterprises located in Rostov region, Moscow, Kazakhstan, Ukraine, Canada and the United States. Key assets of the holding are Rostselmash, Empils and Buhler Industries (Farm King, Versatile). The annual turnover is more than 1 billion dollars.

The main shareholders of Novoe Sodruzhestvo are its three founders and managing directors: Babkin, Dmitry Udras and Yuri Ryazanov.

In conjunction with Dmitry Udras and Yuri Ryazanov withdrew Empils (1998) and Rostselmash (2000) plants from the crisis of the 1990-s.

In November 2004, Babkin was elected the president of Rosspetsmash association, renamed in 2017 in Rosspetsmash. He is the member of the Bureau of the Central Council of Russian Engineering Union.

On 8 October 2006, he was elected the deputy of Novgorod Regional Duma of the fourth convocation in the Free Russia party list, which he headed (11.03%). He is a member of deputy group Veche, and a member of the budget, finance and economy committee.

On 3 September 2010, Babkin initiated the creation of the organizing committee of all-Russian political party Party of Action. On 14 October 2010, at the constituent congress, he was elected the chairman of the Federal Political Party Council.

chairman of the board of the Chamber of Commerce and Industry of the Russian Federation on Industrial Development and Competitiveness of the Russian Economy.

One of the organizers and a co-chairman of the Moscow Economic Forum.

On 2 March 2022, Buhler Industries announced that Babkin had resigned as chairman and from the board of directors of the company.

Monograph 
Author of the book Sound Industrial Policy, or How can we manage to overcome the crisis? /"Razumnaya promyshlennaya politika, ili Kak nam vyyti iz krizisa"/ (Moscow: 2008. — ), which has survived several editions and was translated into English (2012).

Articles
 Babkin K. A. In the interests of modernization of agricultural production // Agricultural Economics of Russia. – 2007. – No. 6. – P. 26—27.
 Babkin K. A., etc. V. V. Putin has held a meeting in Rostov-on-Don with the administration of Rostselmash. The shorthand report of the beginning of the meeting. On July, 6th 2009.

Personal life
Married. With five children: three sons and two daughters

Awards
 2014 was named as the Man of the Year by the Business Quarter magazine, Rostov-on-Don.
 2014 was awarded the title of Honored Machine Builder by the Minister of Industry and Trade of the Russian Federation.

References

1971 births
Living people
Russian businesspeople
Party of Business politicians
Russian company founders
Russian technology company founders
Russian investors
Russian billionaires
21st-century Russian politicians
Russian political activists
People from Miass
Russian Orthodox Christians from Russia
Moscow Institute of Physics and Technology alumni